Game Designers' Workshop (GDW) was a wargame and role-playing game publisher from 1973 to 1996. Many of their games are now carried by other publishers.

History
Game Designers' Workshop was originally established June 22, 1973. The founding members consisted of Frank Chadwick, Rich Banner, Marc Miller, and Loren Wiseman. GDW acquired the Conflict Games Company from John Hill in the early 1970s.

GDW published a new product approximately every twenty-two days for over twenty years.  In an effort to bridge the gap between role players, board wargamers and miniature wargamers, the company published RPGs with fantastic settings alongside games with realistic themes including rulesets for 15mm and 20mm miniatures set during the American Civil War, World War I, World War II, and the modern era; and boardgames involving these eras such as the Air Superiority series and Harpoon.

The company disbanded February 29, 1996 after suffering financial troubles.

Products

Role-playing games
 En Garde! (1975): Dueling game set in 17th-century France, often run as a play-by-mail game.
 Traveller (1977): A science fiction game originally intended as a ruleset for generic space adventures. Revised and reissued as Megatraveller (1987) and with completely different rules and a greatly changed setting as Traveller: The New Era (1993)
 Twilight: 2000 (1984): An alternate history game set in a Europe devastated by nuclear war, with adventures and supplements also dealing with the U.S. and Bangkok.
 Traveller: 2300 (1987): A hard science fiction roleplaying game, set 300 years after the Twilight War featured in Twilight: 2000. Traveller: 2300  was later renamed to 2300 AD in (1988) with the release of the second edition.
 Space: 1889 (1988): Victorian-era spacefaring game which provided for roleplay opportunities, steampunk aerial gunboat engagements and "colonial" miniature warfare with retro-futuristic elements such as Martian brave warbands and odd space creatures.
 Cadillacs and Dinosaurs (1990): Based on the underground comic book Xenozoic Tales.
 Dark Conspiracy (1991): a near-future horror role-playing game (RPG), created by Lester Smith
 Dangerous Journeys (1992): Roleplaying game created by Gary Gygax, the co-creator of the original Dungeons & Dragons system.

Board games

Miniatures rules
 Fire & Steel (Napoleonic Wars, 1978)
 Harpoon (modern naval combat), later developed into a computer game
 Johnny Reb (American Civil War)
 Striker (science fiction, 1983), another Traveller based game.
 Command Decision (20th century warfare, World War II. 1st and 2nd editions; a 3rd edition was written by Frank Chadwick and published in 1998 by EHQ and Old Glory)
 Combined Arms (Cold War, post-WWII)
 TacForce (20th century warfare)
 Over the Top (20th century, WWI)
 Star Cruiser (23rd century space warfare) a 2300AD-based game
 Sky Galleons of Mars (Space 1889 aerial warfare, boxed board game with miniatures)
 Cloudships and Gunboats (Space 1889 aerial Warfare, boxed board game with miniatures)
 Soldier's Companion (Space 1889 land, air and sea warfare)
 Striker II (science fiction, 1994), Traveller: The New Era–based game.
 Volley & Bayonet (big battles in black powder era, 1994)

Grenadier Magazine
The Grenadier was the house magazine from 1978 to 1990, with 35 issues. It started off as a quarterly magazine, but towards the end was published sporadically. Although it covered games from all companies, it gave most of the magazine space to GDW games.

Journal of the Travellers Aid Society 
Journal of the Travellers Aid Society was a magazine dedicated to Traveller published by GDW between 1979 and 1985.

Challenge
Challenge was a role-playing game magazine that replaced Journal of the Travellers Aid Society. It covered all of GDW's role playing games, not just Traveller. It was published between 1986 and 1996.

Video games
The Battle of Chickamauga
Rommel: Battles for Tobruk

Awards
Best Graphics of 1976 Charles S. Roberts Award, Avalanche 
Best Fantasy/Futuristic Game of 1978 Charles S. Roberts Award, Mayday 
Best Miniatures Rules of 1978 H. G. Wells Award, Fire & Steel 
Best Historical Figure Series of 1979 H. G. Wells Award, System Seven Napoleonics 
Best Miniatures Rules of 1979 H. G. Wells Award, System Seven Napoleonics 
Best Roleplaying Adventure of 1979 H. G. Wells Award, Kinunir 
Best Magazine Covering Roleplaying of 1979 H. G. Wells Award, Journal of the Travellers Aid Society 
Best Fantasy or Science Fiction Boardgame of 1980 Charles S. Roberts Award, Azhanti High Lightning 
Best Miniatures Rules of 1980 H. G. Wells Award, Tacforce 
Best Roleplaying Adventure of 1980 H. G. Wells Award, Twilights Peak 
Best Professional Magazine Covering Roleplaying of 1980 H. G. Wells Award, Journal of the Travellers Aid Society 
Best Pre-20th Century Boardgame of 1981 Charles S. Roberts Award, House Divided 
Best Professional Roleplaying Magazine of 1981 H. G. Wells Award, Journal of the Travellers Aid Society 
All Time Best Miniatures Rules for 20th Century Land Battles of 1981 H. G. Wells Award, Tacforce 
Best Miniatures Rules of 1982 H. G. Wells Award, Striker 
Best Roleplaying Rules of 1984 H. G. Wells Award, Twilight: 2000 
Best Miniatures Rules of 1986 H. G. Wells Award, Command Decision 
Best Roleplaying Adventure of 1986 H. G. Wells Award, Going Home 
Best Boardgame Covering the Period 1900-1946 of 1987 Origins Award, Scorched Earth 
Best Boardgame Covering the Period 1947-Modern Day of 1987 Origins Award, Team Yankee 
Best Miniatures Rules of 1987 Origins Award, Harpoon 
Best Miniatures Rules of 1988 Origins Award, To The Sound of the Guns 
Best Fantasy or Science Fiction Boardgame of 1988 Origins Award, Sky Galleons of Mars 
Best Graphic Presentation of a Boardgame of 1988 Origins Award, Sky Galleons of Mars 
Best Pre-World War Two Game of 1989 Charles S. Roberts Award, House Divided (2nd edition)
Best Roleplaying Rules of 1993 Origins Award, Traveller: the New Era

References

Game manufacturers
Role-playing game publishing companies
Board game publishing companies
Wargame companies
Entertainment companies established in 1973
Companies disestablished in 1996